The National Association for Business Economics (NABE) is the largest international association of applied economists, strategists, academics, and policy-makers committed to the application of economics. Founded in 1959, it is one of the member organizations of the Allied Social Science Associations. According to the association's website, "NABE's mission is to provide leadership in the use and understanding of economics.".

NABE was holding its annual conference at the Marriott World Trade Center hotel during the 9/11 attacks.

The association's membership is divided into subject-oriented subdivisions or round tables, including: financial, health economics, international, manufacturing, real estate/construction, regional/utility, small business/entrepreneurship, technology, and transfer pricing. Each round table plans and executes webinars and sessions at NABE meetings each year. NABE also has local and student chapters in many cities and much of the United States.

Leadership

Presidents
Past presidents of the NABE include former Chairman of the Federal Reserve Alan Greenspan and Federal Reserve, Council of Economic Advisers and Congressional Budget Office advisor Diane C. Swonk.  Since 2009, NABE's executive director has been Tom Beers, former chief economist of the Manufactured Housing Institute and economist with the National Association of Realtors and the Bureau of Labor Statistics.

Past presidents include:

Activities
NABE Annual Meeting: The NABE Annual Meeting features speakers, panel discussions, educational sessions, and networking opportunities.  In addition to NABE Members and those in related fields, attendees include business leaders, government officials, analysts, investors, and members of the business media.
Economic Policy Conference: Held annually in the spring in Washington, DC, focuses "on the one seemingly-unpredictable variable that regularly confounds many economists and their models: economic policy". Speakers at the Economic Policy Conference typically include leaders from the Federal Reserve Board, Treasury Department, Congressional Budget Office, Federal Deposit Insurance Corporation, and other government agencies, in addition to analysts at think tanks and other institutions.
Webinars/Teleconferences: Each of the ten NABE Roundtables conducts regular webinars and teleconferences on topics within its area of interest. These sessions are available to both members and non-members.
Publications: NABE offers a variety of publications.  Business Economics, its journal -  as below -  is best known of these. 
NABE Surveys: NABE regularly conducts three surveys of its membership: the Outlook Survey, the Industry Survey, and the Economic Policy Survey. The NABE Outlook Survey, the most well-known of the NABE surveys, provides the consensus forecast of NABE’s professional economic forecasters.

Education and career development
Certified Business Economist: NABE offers continuing education through its Certified Business Economist program which features a comprehensive exam developed and administered by the association. Candidates must have at least a four-year degree, and two years of work experience in applied business economics or in a related field.
Econometrics Certificate Programs: Offered twice yearly at Federal Reserve Banks, NABE's Econometrics Seminars are among its offerings.  Each Summer, NABE offers the Certificate in Applied Econometrics, and each Fall, the Certificate in Time-Series Analysis and Forecasting.
NABE career site: caters to those seeking a job or an employee in the field of economics.
No accreditation appears to exists for their educational products or services.

Journal publication
NABE is the publisher of Business Economics, a scholarly journal that covers different aspects of applied economics and is published quarterly. The journal serves as an essential resource and provides practical information for people who apply economics in the workplace.  It is the leading forum for debating solutions to critical business problems, analyzing key business and economic issues, and sharing of best-practice models, tools, and hands-on techniques from practitioners in the field of economics.

Adam Smith Award
Since 1982, NABE has awarded the Adam Smith Award to prominent economists and policy makers who have contributed to business economics. Recipients of the award include former Federal Reserve chairman Ben Bernanke, in 2014; CEO and president of TIAA-CREF Roger Ferguson, in 2013; vice chair of the Board of Governors of the Federal Reserve System Janet Yellen, in 2010; former director of the National Economic Council Lawrence Summers in 2009, chief executive of the Federal Reserve Bank of St. Louis William Poole, in 2006; Princeton University economics professor Paul Krugman, in 1995; and Chicago School economist and recipient of the Nobel Prize in Economics Milton Friedman in 1989.

Paul A. Volcker Lifetime Achievement Award for Economic Policy 
Each March, NABE presents the Paul A. Volcker Award to a senior policymaker recognizing outstanding contributions to the field of economic and monetary policy in his or her career. Past recipients include:

See also

 List of economics awards

External links
 NABE homepage

References

Economics societies
1959 establishments in the United States
Organizations established in 1959
Business in the United States